The 2010 Qantas Film and Television Awards were held on Saturday 18 September at the Civic Theatre in Auckland, New Zealand. The craft awards were presented in a separate awards lunch at the Auckland Town Hall on Friday 17 September. It was the final of the Qantas Film and Television Awards, before Qantas was lost as the naming-rights sponsor and the awards were renamed the Aotearoa Film and Television Awards.

The awards are best remembered for the expletive-filled acceptance speech given by Breakfast presenter Paul Henry upon winning the People's Choice Award. Highlights from the main awards evening were broadcast on Sunday 19 September on TV ONE.

Nominees and winners

Awards were given in 58 categories, covering news and current affairs, general television, feature film and short film.

News and current affairs

Qantas Best News
 ONE News (TV One) 3 News (TV3)
 Tonight (TV One)Best News or Current Affairs Presenter John Campbell, Campbell Live, "Tsunami Aftermath" (TV3) Hilary Barry & Mike McRoberts, 3 News, "Aisling Symes" (TV3)
 Carly Flynn, Sunrise, "Samoa Tsunami" (TV3)Best News Reporting Paul Hobbs, ONE News, "TSU Funerals" (TV One) Lisa Owen, ONE News, "Baker Hostage" (TV One)
 Rebecca Wright, 3 News, "Drink Drive Fly" (TV3)Journalist of the Year Paul Hobbs, "TSU Funerals", ONE News (TV One)Best Current Affairs Reporting for a weekly programme or one off current affairs special Janet McIntyre & Joanne Mitchell, Sunday, "Discourse with a Dictator" (TV One) John Hudson & Jane Skinner, Sunday, "Child Brides" (TV One)
 Karen McCarthy, 60 Minutes, "Homicide" (TV3)Best Current Affairs Reporting for a daily programme Brook Sabin, Campbell Live, "Darryl's Recovery" (TV3) Corinne Ambler, Close Up, "Dwarf" (TV One)
 Natasha Utting, Campbell Live, "Fraudster" (TV3)

 News and current affairs (craft)Best Current Affairs Series Sunday (TV One) Campbell Live (TV3)
 Willie Jackson's NewsBites (Maori Television)Best News Camera Steve Lawton, ONE News, "Birds" (TV One) Michael Lacoste, 3 News, "Maubisse, Haiti and Bangkok" (TV3)
 Daniel O'Sullivan, ONE News, "Ice Energy" (TV One)Best Current Affairs Camera Martin Anderson, 20/20, "Lost and Found" (TV2) Ken Dorman, Sunday, "Brave Choice" (TV One)
 Belinda Walshe, 60 Minutes, "Braking Point" (TV3)
 Belinda Walshe, 60 Minutes, "Drug Runner" (TV3)Best News Editing Andrew Gibb, Breakfast, "Spelling Bee" (TV One) Kirsten Bolam, ONE News, "Cavalcade" (TV One)
 Paul Sparkes, ONE News, "Opshop" (TV One)Best Current Affairs Editing Catherine Hallinan, Campbell Live, "Darryl" (TV3) Andrew Gibb, Close Up, "Apprentice" (TV One)
 Vicky Harker, Sunday Episode 24, "Born to Dance" (TV One)

 General televisionBest Drama Programme Outrageous Fortune, South Pacific Pictures (TV3) The Cult, Rachel Gardner, Great Southern Television Ltd (TV 2)
 Go Girls, South Pacific Pictures (TV3)Best Comedy Programme The Jaquie Brown Diaries, Jaquie Brown, Gerard Johnstone, Young, Gifted & Brown (TV3) 7 Days, Jon Bridges & the downlow concept (TV3)
 Pulp Sport, Jamie Linehan & Ben Boyce, Shonky Productions (TV3)Best Maori Language Programme E Tu Kahikatea, TeNoni Ltd (Maori Television) AKO, Jeni-Leigh Walker & Pānia Papa (Maori Television)
 Moteatea, Hinewehi Mohi (Maori Television)Best Children's/Youth Programme Reservoir Hill, KHF Media (TV2) Let's Get Inventin' "Eco Rat Trap", Luke Nola and Friends Ltd (TV2)
 Kaitangata Twitch, Christopher Hampson Production Shed.TV (Maori Television)Best Information/Lifestyle Programme Radar's Patch, Jane Andrews, JAM TV Ltd (TV One)
 Fair Go, Graeme Muir, TVNZ (TV One)
 South, Melanie Rakena and Marcus Lush, JAM TV Ltd (TV One)Best Entertainment Programme The Topp Twins & The APO, Arwen O'Connor, Satellite Media (TV3)
 Good Morning: Sir Howard Morrison Special, Sally-Anne Kerr, TVNZ (TV One)
 Homai Te Pakipaki, Homai Te Pakipaki (Maori Television)Best Sports Broadcast TV3 V8 Supercars Hamilton 400, Nigel Carpenter, TV3 (TV3)
 Heineken Open Tennis Final 2010, Steve Jamieson, TVNZ (TV One)
 International Netball Series 2009, Barbara Mitchell, TVNZ (TV One)Best Observational Reality Series Intrepid Journeys, Dean Cornish, JAM TV Ltd (TV One) Neighbours at War, Sarah Kinniburgh, Greenstone Pictures (TV2)
 Piha Rescue, Eric Derks, South Pacific Video Productions (TV One)Best Constructed Reality Series One Land, Julie Christie & Bailey Mackey, Eyeworks New Zealand (TV One) MasterChef New Zealand, Bettina Hollings & Darryl McEwen, Imagination Television (TV One)
 The Apprentice, Glenn Sims & Philip Smith, Great Southern Television Ltd (TV2)Best Performance by an Actress – General Television Danielle Cormack, The Cult, Great Southern Television Ltd (TV2) Kate Elliott, The Cult, Great Southern Television Ltd (TV2)
 Siobhan Marshall, Outrageous Fortune, South Pacific Pictures (TV 3)Best Performance by a Supporting Actress – General Television Lisa Chappell, The Cult, Great Southern Television Ltd (TV2) Chelsie Preston Crayford, The Cult, Great Southern Television Ltd (TV2)
 Miriama Smith, Kaitangata Twitch, Production Shed.TV (Maori Television)Best Performance by an Actor – General Television George Henare, Kaitangata Twitch, Production Shed.TV (Maori Television) Latham Gaines, The Cult, Great Southern Television Ltd (TV2)
 Kirk Torrance, Outrageous Fortune, South Pacific Pictures (TV3)Best Performance by a Supporting Actor – General Television Matt Whelan, Go Girls, South Pacific Pictures, (TV2) Grant Bowler, Outrageous Fortune, South Pacific Pictures (TV3)
 Scott Wills, The Cult, Great Southern Television Ltd (TV2)Best Presenter Entertainment/Factual Programme Marcus Lush, South, Jam TV Ltd (TV One) Petra Bagust, What's Really in Our Food?, Top Shelf Productions Limited (TV3)
 Te Radar, Radar's Patch, JAM TV (TV One)Best Script – Drama/Comedy Programme James Griffin, Outrageous Fortune, South Pacific Pictures (TV3)
 Michael Bennett, Kaitangata Twitch, Production Shed.TV (Maori Television)
 Rachel Lang, Go Girls, South Pacific Pictures, (TV2)Best Director – Drama/Comedy Programme Gerard Johnstone, The Jaquie Brown Diaries, Young, Gifted and Brown (TV3)
 Peter Burger, Go Girls, South Pacific Pictures (TV2)
 David Stubbs & Thomas Robins, Reservoir Hill, KHF Media Ltd (TV2)Best Director – Factual/Entertainment Programme Melanie Rakena, South, JAM TV Ltd (TV One)
 Jane Andrews, Radar's Patch, JAM TV (TV One)
 Belinda Simpson, Intrepid Journeys (TV One)

 General television (craft)Best Multi Camera Direction in General Television Steve Jamieson, Heineken Open Tennis Final 2010, TVNZ (TV One) Steve Jamieson, Takapuna Sprint Triathlon, TVNZ (TV One)
 Barbara Mitchell, International Netball Series 2009, TVNZ (TV One)Best Cinematography – Drama/Comedy Programme Simon Reira, The Cult, Great Southern Television Ltd (TV2) David Paul, Kaitangata Twitch, Production Shed.TV (Maori Television)
 Marty Smith, Outrageous Fortune, South Pacific Pictures (TV3)Images & Sound Best Editing – Drama/Comedy Programme Eric de Beus, The Cult, Great Southern Television Ltd (TV2) Bryan Shaw, Outrageous Fortune, South Pacific Pictures (TV3)
 Mark Taylor, Go Girls, South Pacific Pictures (TV2)Best Original Music in General Television Rhian Sheehan, The Cult, Great Southern Television Ltd (TV2) Gareth Farr, Kaitangata Twitch, Production Shed.TV (Maori Television)
 Eden Mulholland, World Kitchen, Zoomslide Media Ltd (TV3)Best Sound Design in General Television Tom Miskin, James Hayday & Steve Finnigan, Kaitangata Twitch, Production Shed.TV (Maori Television) Tom Miskin, Steve Finnigan, Go Girls, South Pacific Pictures (TV2)
 Carl Smith, Outrageous Fortune, South Pacific Pictures (TV3)Best Production Design in General Television Gary Mackay, Kaitangata Twitch, Production Shed (Maori Television) Clayton Ercolano, Outrageous Fortune, South Pacific Pictures (TV3)
 Gary Mackay, Go Girls, South Pacific Pictures (TV2)Best Contribution to Design in General Television David Cooke, The Cult, Great Southern Television Ltd (TV2) Katrina Hodge, Outrageous Fortune, South Pacific Pictures (TV3)
 Sarah Voon, Go Girls, South Pacific Pictures (TV2)

 DocumentaryBest Popular Documentary Lost in Wonderland, Costa Botes, Lone Pine Film Donated to Science, Paul Trotman, PRNfilms (TV3)
 The Worst Offenders, Virginia Wright, Southern Screen Productions (TV One)Best Arts/Festival/Feature Documentary* This Way of Life, Cloud South Films There Once was an Island: Te Henua e Nnoho, Lyn Collie and Briar March
 The Unnatural History of the Kakapo, ELWIN ProductionsBest Director – Documentary Thomas Burstyn, This Way of Life, Cloud South Films Tearepa Kahi, The Flight of Te Hookioi, Monsoon Pictures International Ltd (Maori Television)
 Robin Shingleton, Real Crime: The Truth About Us, Project Melting Pot (TV One)

 Documentary (craft)Best Cinematography – Documentary/Factual Programme Marty Williams, Costa Botes & Gareth Moon, Lost in Wonderland, Lone Pine Film Thomas Burstyn, This Way of Life, Cloud South Films
 Briar March, There Once was an Island: Te Henua e NnohoBest Editing – Documentary/Factual Programme Prisca Bouchet & Briar March, There Once was an Island: Te Henua e Nnoho
 Cushla Dillion, This Way of Life, Cloud South Films
 Ken Sparks, The Worst Offenders, Southern Screen Productions (TV One)

Feature film

Best Feature Film
 Boy, Ainsley Gardiner, Whenua Films Home by Christmas, Gaylene Preston, Sue Rogers & Nigel Hutchinson, Doublehead Films
 Under the Mountain, Richard Fletcher, Matthew Grainger & Jonathan King, Redhead FilmsBest Director in a Film Feature Taika Waititi, Boy, Whenua Films Gaylene Preston, Home by Christmas, Doublehead Films
 Stephen Sinclair, Russian Snark, Godzone PicturesBest Lead Actor in a Feature Film 
 Tony Barry, Home by Christmas, Doublehead Films 
 Stephen Papps, Russian Snark, Godzone Pictures
 James Rolleston, Boy, Whenua FilmsBest Lead Actress in a Feature Film 
 Vera Farmiga, The Vintner's Luck, Ascension Film Ltd Alison Bruce, Life's a Riot, Riot Productions
 Elena Stejko, Russian Snark, Godzone PicturesBest Supporting Actor in a Feature Film Taika Waititi, Boy, Whenua Films Te Aho Eketone-Whitu, Boy, Whenua Films
 Sam Neill, Under the Mountain, Redhead Films LimitedBest Supporting Actress in a Feature Film Stephanie Tauevihi, Russian Snark, Godzone Pictures Keisha Castle-Hughes, The Vintner's Luck, Ascension Film Ltd
 Tina Cleary, Home by Christmas, Doublehead FilmsBest Screenplay for a Feature Film Taika Waititi, Boy, Whenua Films Dean Parker, Life's a Riot, Riot Productions
 Gaylene Preston, Home by Christmas, Doublehead Films

 Feature film (craft)Best Cinematography in a Feature Film Adam Clark, Boy, Whenua Films Alun Bollinger, Home by Christmas, Doublehead Films
 Denis Lenoir, The Vintner's Luck, Ascension Film LtdBest Editing in a Feature Film Chris Plummer, Boy, Whenua Films Ken Sparks, Life's a Riot, Riot Productions
 Paul Sutorius, Home by Christmas, Doublehead FilmsBest Original Music in a Feature Film Lukasz Buda, Samuel Scott & Conrad Wedde, Boy, Whenua Films Victoria Kelly, Under the Mountain, Redhead Films Limited
 David Long & Stephen Gallagher, Russian Snark, Godzone PicturesBest Sound Design in a Feature Film 
 Tim Prebble, Ken Saville, Michael Hedges & Gethin Creagh, Home by Christmas, Doublehead Films 
 Tim Prebble, Gethin Creagh & Gilbert Lake, Under the Mountain, Redhead Films Limited
 Ken Saville, Tim Prebble, Chris Todd, Michael Hedges & Gilbert Lake, Boy, Whenua FilmsBest Production Design in a Feature Film 
 Grant Major, The Vintner's Luck, Ascension Film Ltd Ralph Davies, Under the Mountain, Redhead Films Limited
 Shayne Radford, Boy, Whenua FilmsBest Costume Design in a Feature Film 
 Beatrix Pasztor, The Vintner's Luck, Ascension Film Ltd Leslie Burkes-Harding, Home by Christmas, Doublehead Films
 Amanda Neale, Boy, Whenua FilmsBest Make-Up Design in a Feature Film Steve Boyle & Jane O'Kane, Under the Mountain, Redhead Films Limited Angela Mooar, Home by Christmas, Doublehead Films
 Dannelle Satherley, Boy, Whenua FilmsBest Visual Effects in a Feature Film Charlie McClellan, Under the Mountain, Redhead Films Limited Park Road Post, Russian Snark, Godzone Pictures
 George Ritchie, The Vintner's Luck, Ascension Film Ltd

 Short films Best Short Film thedownlowconcept, Only Son, thedownlowconcept Zoe McIntosh, Day Trip, Lone Pine Film
 Sam Peacocke, Manurewa, Robber's Dog Films LtdBest Performance in a Short Film Tuhoe Isaac, Day Trip, Lone Pine Film Aaron McGregor, Choice Night, POP Film
 Josh Thomson, Only Son, thedownlowconcept

 Short films (craft) Best Screenplay for a Short Film Thedownlowconcept, Ryan Hutchings, Jarrod Holt, Nigel McCulloch, Only Son, thedownlowconcept Sam Peacocke, Manurewa, Robber's Dog Films Ltd
 Paul Stanley Ward, Choice Night, POP FilmOutstanding Technical Contribution to a Short Film Ginny Loane, Redemption, Isola Productions Ltd Robert Key, Roof Rattling, Robin Murphy Productions Limited
 Gareth Moon, Jodie Stack, Chris Ulutupu & Kate Logan, Day Trip, Lone Pine Film

 People's choice award
 Paul Henry, Breakfast
 Beth Allen, Shortland Street
 Jason Gunn, Cheers to 50 Years
 Kimberley Crossman, Shortland Street
 Robyn Malcolm, Outrageous Fortune
 Jaquie Brown, The Jaquie Brown Diaries
 Mike McRoberts, 3 News
 Bernadine Oliver-Kerby, ONE News
 Pippa Wetzell, Breakfast
 Kevin Milne, Fair Go

References

New Zealand film awards
New Zealand television awards
Qantas Awards
New Zealand
New Zealand
2010 in New Zealand television
2010s in New Zealand cinema
Qantas